Saint-Lazare Prison was a prison in the 10th arrondissement of Paris, France.

History
Originally a leprosarium was founded on the road from Paris to Saint-Denis at the boundary of the marshy area of the former River Seine bank in the 12th century. It was ceded on 7 January 1632 to St. Vincent de Paul and the Congregation of the Mission he had founded. At this stage, it became a place of detention for people who had become an embarrassment to their families: an enclosure for "black sheep" who had brought disgrace to their relatives.

The prison was situated in the enclos Saint-Lazare, the largest enclosure in Paris until the end of the 18th century, between the Rue de Paradis to its south, the Rue du Faubourg-Saint-Denis to its east, the Boulevard de la Chapelle to its north and the Rue Sainte-Anne to its west (today the Rue du Faubourg Poissonnière). Its site is now marked by the Church of Saint-Vincent-de-Paul.

The building was converted to prison at the time of the Reign of Terror in 1793, then a women's prison in the early 19th century, its land having been seized and re-allotted little by little since the Revolution. It was largely demolished in 1935, with the Assistance publique - Hôpitaux de Paris installing itself in the remaining buildings, where they remained until recently. Only the prison infirmary and chapel (built by Louis-Pierre Baltard in 1834) remain of the prison, with the latter to be seen in the square Alban-Satragne (107, rue du Faubourg-Saint-Denis) in the 10th arrondissement. The surviving remains of the Saint-Lazare prison were inscribed on the supplementary inventory of historic monuments in November 2005.

The Musée de la Révolution française conserves a portrait of Joseph Cange, a prison officer at the Saint-Lazare prison during the reign of Terror, who gave financial help to the family of a prisoner at the risk of his life and that was honoured nationally after the fall of Robespierre.

A song by Aristide Bruant entitled "À Saint-Lazare is named after the prison.

Famous prisoners

Pre-Revolution
 Henri de Saint-Simon,  French social theorist and one of the chief founders of Christian socialism 
 Pierre de Beaumarchais, playwright

During the Revolution
 François-Joseph Bélanger, architect
 Adèle de Bellegarde, salonnière and model for Jacques-Louis David
 André Chénier, poet
 Aimée de Coigny (1769–1820), known as la Jeune Captive from her elegy by André Chénier
 Hubert Robert, painter
 Marquis de Sade, writer and libertine
 Joseph-Benoît Suvée, painter
 Charles-Louis Trudaine, conseiller au Parlement
 Jean-Antoine Roucher, receveur des gabelles, poet, portrayed several times by Hubert Robert
 Thomas de Treil de Pardailhan, former baron and député for Paris in the Legislative Assembly

Post-Revolution
 Louise Michel, communard
 Mata Hari, spy
 Léonie Biard, Victor Hugo's mistress

Sources
 Jacques Hillairet, Gibets, Piloris et Cachots du vieux Paris, éditions de Minuit, Paris, 1956.
  Appel des dernières victimes de la terreur à la prison Saint-Lazare à Paris les 7-9 Thermidor an II by Charles-Louis Muller (1815–1892), painting held at the Musée national du château de Versailles.

Notes

External links 
 

Leper colonies
Buildings and structures in the 10th arrondissement of Paris
Saint-Lazare
Congregation of the Mission
Buildings and structures demolished in 1935
Hospitals in Paris